Danuta Lubowska (born 21 May 1956) is a Polish gymnast. She competed at the 1972 Summer Olympics.

References

External links
 

1956 births
Living people
Polish female artistic gymnasts
Olympic gymnasts of Poland
Gymnasts at the 1972 Summer Olympics
Sportspeople from Zabrze
20th-century Polish women